Below is a list of current Australian records in athletics as ratified by the national governing body, Athletics Australia. There are two types of Australian records. An Australian record is the best time recorded anywhere in the world by an athlete or team holding Australian citizenship whilst an Australian All Comers record is the best time recorded in Australia by an athlete or team.

Outdoor

Key to tables:

+ = en route to a longer distance

h = hand timing

A = affected by altitude

a = aided road course according to IAAF rule 260.28

NWI = no wind information

Mx = mark was made in a mixed race

OT = oversized track (> 200m in circumference)

Men

Women

Mixed

Indoor

Men

Women

Notes

References
General
Australian Records 21 November 2022 updated
Specific

External links
AA web site

Records
Athletics
Athletics records
Australian